Maarten Hamckema ( in Follega – 1620), sometimes anglicized as Marten Hamkes and mainly known by his pen name Martinus Hamconius, was a Frisian writer, poet and historian best known for his apocryphal history books on the Kingdom of Frisia.

1550s births
1620 deaths
16th-century Dutch writers
Frisian writers
West Frisian-language writers
People from De Fryske Marren